This is a list of the world's largest law firms, using data from fiscal year 2021. Firms marked with "(verein)" are structured as a Swiss association.

See also
List of largest law firms by profits per partner
List of largest United States-based law firms
List of largest United Kingdom-based law firms by revenue
List of largest Canada-based law firms by revenue
List of largest Europe-based law firms by revenue
List of largest Japan-based law firms by head count
List of largest China-based law firms by revenue

References